Lisbeth Margareta Åkerman (born 6 May 1967 in Vänersborg, Sweden) is a Swedish broadcast journalist and news presenter, currently working as one of the main anchors of SVT1's flagship news programme Rapport on SVT.

References

External links

1967 births
Swedish journalists
Swedish women journalists
Swedish television hosts
Living people
Television news anchors
Women television journalists
Swedish women television presenters